Pierre-Hugues Herbert and Nicolas Mahut were the defending champions and successfully defended their title, defeating Chris Guccione and André Sá in the final, 6–3, 7–6(7–5).

Seeds

Draw

Draw

Qualifying

Seeds

Qualifiers
  Chris Guccione /  André Sá

Lucky losers
  Steve Johnson /  Nicholas Monroe

Qualifying draw

External links
 Main draw
 Qualifying draw

Doubles
Queen's Club Championships - Doubles